The Quickboat is a folding boat, based on the flat-out-boat geometry. It is constructed using composites with high density foam cores.

The first boats were due for release to the public in mid-2013. Before release, the Quickboat was expected to weigh around 50 kg, seat four people, and to have a capacity for up to a 9.8 hp engine providing it with top speeds in excess of 20 knots.

In November 2012, Quickboats launched a crowd-funding campaign on Indiegogo, and within 26 hours had already reached their goal. By the end of the campaign, the company had secured over $65,000 in funding with investors from 44 different countries.

In 2012 Quickboat Holdings Ltd acquired all of the initial technology for Quickboats from Quickstep Holdings Ltd, a public aerospace company specializing in advanced composite manufacturing and technology development.

References

External links
 Quickboats site

Folding boats